Necropolis is an autobiographical novel by Boris Pahor about his Holocaust experience. It has been compared to works by Primo Levi, Imre Kertész, and Jorge Semprún.

Plot summary
The story is told from the point of view of a Nazi concentration camp survivor who is visiting the Natzweiler-Struthof camp, twenty years after he was sent from there back to Dachau, Mittelbau-Dora, Harzungen, and finally Bergen-Belsen, which was liberated on 15 April 1945.

International recognition
The Slovene philosopher Evgen Bavčar, living in France—Pahor's friend, whose mother worked in Trieste, as Pahor's mother did—predicted that as a Slovene writer Pahor would be recognized by Italy only after he was recognized by France and Germany. As explained in a 2010 documentary and in an interview with Pahor that was published in 2013 by Bukla Magazine, Italian publishers were not interested in publishing Pahor until French and German translations were published. Only after France and Germany recognized Pahor did his work finally begin to be published in Italy in 2007.

Publication history
The work has been published in several languages in the decades since its first publication in 1967. The novel has been translated twice into English, first under the title Pilgrim Among the Shadows in 1995, and the second time under the title Necropolis in 2010. It has also been translated into French: Pèlerin parmi les ombres (1996), German: Nekropolis (2001, 2003),  Catalan: Necròpolis (2004), Finnish: Nekropoli (2006), Italian: Necropoli (2008), Serbian: Necropola (2009), Spanish: Necrópolis (2010), Dutch: Nekropolis (2011), Croatian: Nekropola (2012), Portuguese: Necrópole (2013), Swedish: Nekropol (2013), and Esperanto: Pilgrimanto inter ombroj.

Adaptation
In 2010, the novel was adapted for theater.

See also
The Holocaust in art and literature
Slovenian literature

Notes

References

1967 novels
Novels about the Holocaust
Slovenian novels
Novels adapted into plays